Theodore M. "Bubbles" Anderson (November 4, 1904 – March 14, 1943) was an American baseball player in the Negro leagues.  He played primarily second base for the Kansas City Monarchs, Washington Potomacs, Birmingham Black Barons, and the Indianapolis ABCs from 1922 until 1925. He played for the minor Negro league Denver White Elephants from 1920 through 1921 and again from 1932 to 1933.

Anderson also served during World War II in the US Army.  He died at the age of 38 from a gastric ulcer. He is buried at Fairmount Cemetery in Denver, Colorado.

References

External links
 and Baseball-Reference Black Baseball Stats and  Seamheads 
 NLPA Home

1904 births
1943 deaths
All Nations players
Atlanta Black Crackers players
Birmingham Black Barons players
Indianapolis ABCs players
Kansas City Monarchs players
Washington Potomacs players
Baseball players from Denver
Deaths from ulcers
United States Army personnel of World War II
20th-century African-American sportspeople
Baseball infielders